Lysak may refer to:
 Lysak (surname)
 Łysak, Warmian-Masurian Voivodeship, Poland

See also